Gavazleh (also known as Gavazlī) is a village in Alan Rural District, in the Central District of Sardasht County, West Azerbaijan Province, Iran. In 2006, its population was 82, in 18 families.

References 

Populated places in Sardasht County